In Buddhism, Buddha (Pali, Sanskrit: 𑀩𑀼𑀤𑁆𑀥, बुद्ध), "awakened one", is a title for those who are awake, and have attained nirvana and Buddhahood through their own efforts and insight, without a teacher to point out the dharma (Sanskrit 𑀥𑀭𑁆𑀫; Pali dhamma; "right way of living"). The title is most commonly used for Gautama Buddha, the founder of Buddhism, who is often simply known as "the Buddha".  Buddhahood (buddhatva;  or) is the condition and  rank of a buddha "awakened one". This highest spiritual state of being is also termed sammā-sambodhi (skt. samyaksaṃbodhi 'full complete awakening').

The title is also used for other beings who have achieved bodhi (awakening) and moksha (release from craving), such as the other human Buddhas who achieved enlightenment before Gautama, the five celestial Buddhas worshiped primarily in Mahayana, and the bodhisattva named Maitreya, who will achieve enlightenment in the future and succeed Gautama Buddha as the supreme Buddha of the world. 

The goal of Mahayana's bodhisattva path is complete Buddhahood, so that one may benefit all sentient beings by teaching them the path of cessation of dukkha. Mahayana theory contrasts this with the goal of the Theravada path, where the most common goal is individual arhatship by following dharma; the teachings of the supreme Buddha.

Definition

Buddhahood is the state of an awakened being, who, having found the path of cessation of dukkha ("suffering", as created by attachment to desires and distorted perception and thinking) is in the state of "No-more-Learning".

There is a broad spectrum of opinion on the universality and method of attainment of Buddhahood, depending on Gautama Buddha's teachings that a school of Buddhism emphasizes. The level to which this manifestation requires ascetic practices varies from none at all to an absolute requirement, dependent on doctrine. Mahayana Buddhism emphasizes the bodhisattva ideal of achieving Buddhahood rather than enlightening as an arhat.

In Theravada Buddhism, Buddha refers to one who has become awake through their own efforts and insight, without a teacher to point out the dharma. A samyaksambuddha re-discovered the truths and the path to awakening and teaches these to others after his awakening. A pratyekabuddha also reaches Nirvana through his own efforts, but is unable to teach the dharma to others. An arhat needs to follow the teaching of a Buddha to attain Nirvana, but can also preach the dharma after attaining Nirvana. In one instance the term buddha is also used in Theravada to refer to all who attain Nirvana, using the term Sāvakabuddha to designate an arhat, someone who depends on the teachings of a Buddha to attain Nirvana. In this broader sense it is equivalent to the arhat.

The Tathagatagarba and Buddha-nature doctrines of Mahayana Buddhism consider Buddhahood to be a universal and innate property of absolute wisdom. This wisdom is revealed in a person's current lifetime through Buddhist practice, without any specific relinquishment of pleasures or "earthly desires".

Buddhists do not consider Gautama Buddha to have been the only Buddha. The Pāli Canon refers to many previous ones (see list of the named Buddhas), while the Mahayana tradition additionally has many Buddhas of celestial origin (see Amitābha or Vairocana as examples. For lists of many thousands of Buddha names see Taishō Tripiṭaka numbers 439–448).

Nature of the Buddha

The various Buddhist schools hold some varying interpretations on the nature of Buddha.

Attainments

All Buddhist traditions hold that a Buddha is fully awakened and has completely purified his mind of the three poisons of craving, aversion and ignorance. A Buddha is no longer bound by saṃsāra, and has ended the suffering which unawakened people experience in life.

Most schools of Buddhism have also held that the Buddha was omniscient. However, the early texts contain explicit repudiations of making this claim of the Buddha.

Ten characteristics of a Buddha
Some Buddhists meditate on (or contemplate) the Buddha as having ten characteristics (Ch./Jp. 十號). These characteristics are frequently mentioned in the Pāli Canon as well as Mahayana teachings, and are chanted daily in many Buddhist monasteries:
Thus gone, thus come
Worthy one (Skt: arhat)
Perfectly self-enlightened
Perfected in knowledge and conduct
Well gone (Skt: sugata)
Knower of the world (Skt: lokavida)
 Unsurpassed leader of persons to be tamed
Teacher of the gods and humans
The Enlightened One (Skt: buddha)
The Blessed One or fortunate one (Skt: bhagavat)

The tenth epithet is sometimes listed as "The World Honored Enlightened One" (Skt. Buddha-Lokanatha) or "The Blessed Enlightened One" (Skt. Buddha-Bhagavan).

Indispensable Duties of a Buddha 
According to Buddhist texts, upon reaching Buddhahood each Buddha performs various acts during his life to complete his duty as a Buddha.

Sanskrit Buddhist texts list ten indispensable acts Buddhas perform.

 Buddha predicts that another person will attain Buddhahood in the future.
 Buddha inspires somebody else to strive for Buddhahood.
 Buddha converts all whom he must convert
 Buddha lives at least three-quarters of his potential lifespan.
 Buddha clearly defines what are good deeds and what are evil deeds.
 Buddha appoints two of his disciples as his chief disciples.
 Buddha is descended from Tavatimsa Heaven after teaching his mother.
 Buddha holds an assembly at Lake Anavatapta.
 Buddha brings his parents to the Dhamma.
 Buddha performs the great Miracle at Savatthi.
Tibetan Buddhist texts list "Twelve Great Acts" of a Buddha.

 A Buddha must be born in Tusita heaven immediately before his birth as a Buddha.
 A Buddha must descend from Tusita.
 A Buddha must enter his mothers womb.
 A Buddha must be born.
 A Buddha must be skilled at various arts in his youth.
 A Buddha must live life in the palace.
 A Buddha must make a great departure from his palace.
 A Buddha must practice asceticism.
 A Buddha must defeat Mara.
 A Buddha must enlighten.
 A Buddha must give his first sermon.
 A Buddha must die and pass into Nirvana.

Pali texts do not have such a list but the Pali commentarial tradition lists 30 obligatory acts.

Buddha as a supreme human 

In the Pāli Canon, Gautama Buddha is known as being a "teacher of the gods and humans", superior to both the gods and humans in the sense of having nirvana or the greatest bliss, whereas the devas, or gods, are still subject to anger, fear and sorrow.

In the Madhupindika Sutta (MN 18), Buddha is described in powerful terms as the Lord of the Dhamma (Pali: Dhammasami, skt.: Dharma Swami) and the bestower of immortality (Pali: Amatassadata).

Similarly, in the Anuradha Sutta (SN 44.2) Buddha is described as 

In the Vakkali Sutta (SN 22.87) Buddha identifies himself with the Dhamma:

Another reference from the Aggañña Sutta of the Digha Nikaya, says to his disciple Vasettha:

Shravasti Dhammika, a Theravada monk, writes:

Sangharakshita also states that "The first thing we have to understand—and this is very important—is that the Buddha is a human being. But a special kind of human being, in fact the highest kind, so far as we know."

Buddha as a human

When asked whether he was a deva or a human, he replied that he had eliminated the deep-rooted unconscious traits that would make him either one, and should instead be called a Buddha; one who had grown up in the world but had now gone beyond it, as a lotus grows from the water but blossoms above it, unsoiled.

Andrew Skilton writes that the Buddha was never historically regarded by Buddhist traditions as being merely human:

However, Thích Nhất Hạnh, a Vietnamese Buddhist monk in the Zen tradition, states that "Buddha was not a god. He was a human being like you and me, and he suffered just as we do."

Jack Maguire writes that Buddha is inspirational based on his humanness.

Basing his teachings on the Lotus Sutra, the Chinese monk Chi-hi (the founder of the Tendai Sect) developed an explanation of life "three thousand realms in a single moment", which posits a Buddha nature that can be awakened in any life, and that it is possible for a person to become "enlightened to the Law". In this view, the state of Buddhahood and the states of ordinary people are exist with and within each other.

Nichiren, the founder of Nichiren Buddhism states that the real meaning of the Lord Shakyamuni Buddha’s appearance in this world lay in his behavior as a human being. He also stated that "Shakyamuni Buddha . . . the Lotus Sutra ... and we ordinary human beings are in no way different or separate from each other".

Mahāsāṃghika supramundane Buddha
In the early Buddhist schools, the Mahāsāṃghika branch regarded the buddhas as being characterized primarily by their supramundane nature. The Mahāsāṃghikas advocated the transcendental and supramundane nature of the buddhas and bodhisattvas, and the fallibility of arhats. Of the 48 special theses attributed by the Samayabhedoparacanacakra to the Mahāsāṃghika Ekavyāvahārika, Lokottaravāda, and the Kukkuṭika, 20 points concern the supramundane nature of buddhas and bodhisattvas. According to the Samayabhedoparacanacakra, these four groups held that the Buddha is able to know all dharmas in a single moment of the mind. Yao Zhihua writes:

A doctrine ascribed to the Mahāsāṃghikas is, "The power of the tathāgatas is unlimited, and the life of the buddhas is unlimited." According to Guang Xing, two main aspects of the Buddha can be seen in Mahāsāṃghika teachings: the true Buddha who is omniscient and omnipotent, and the manifested forms through which he liberates sentient beings through skillful means. For the Mahāsaṃghikas, the historical Gautama Buddha was one of these transformation bodies (Skt. nirmāṇakāya), while the essential real Buddha is equated with the Dharmakāya.

As in Mahāyāna traditions, the Mahāsāṃghikas held the doctrine of the existence of many contemporaneous buddhas throughout the ten directions. In the Mahāsāṃghika Lokānuvartana Sūtra, it is stated, "The Buddha knows all the dharmas of the countless buddhas of the ten directions." It is also stated, "All buddhas have one body, the body of the Dharma." The concept of many bodhisattvas simultaneously working toward buddhahood is also found among the Mahāsāṃghika tradition, and further evidence of this is given in the Samayabhedoparacanacakra, which describes the doctrines of the Mahāsāṃghikas.

Lists of Buddhas

The Seven Buddhas of Antiquity 
In the earliest strata of Pali Buddhist texts, especially in the first four Nikayas, only the following seven Buddhas, The Seven Buddhas of Antiquity (Saptatathāgata), are explicitly mentioned and named. Four of these are from the current kalpa (world age) and three are from past ones (within last hundred kalpa). 
 Vipassī (lived ninety-one kalpas ago)
 Sikhī  (lived thirty-one kalpas ago)
 Vessabhū (lived thirty-one kalpas ago in the same kalpa as Sikhī)
 Kakusandha (the first Buddha of the current bhadrakalpa)
 Koṇāgamana (the second Buddha of the current bhadrakalpa)
 Kassapa (the third Buddha of the current bhadrakalpa)
 Gautama (the fourth and present Buddha of the current bhadrakalpa)

One sutta called Chakkavatti-Sīhanāda Sutta from an early Buddhist text called the Digha Nikaya also mentions that following the Seven Buddhas of Antiquity, a Buddha named Maitreya is predicted to arise in the world.

However, according to a text in the Theravada Buddhist tradition from a later strata (between 1st and 2nd century BCE) called the Buddhavamsa, twenty-one more Buddhas were added to the list of seven names in the early texts. Theravada tradition maintains that there can be up to five Buddhas in a kalpa or world age and that the current kalpa has had four Buddhas, with the current Buddha, Gotama, being the fourth and the future Buddha Metteyya being the fifth and final Buddha of the kalpa. This would make the current aeon a bhadrakalpa (fortunate aeon). In some Sanskrit and northern Buddhist traditions however, a bhadrakalpa has up to 1,000 Buddhas, with the Buddhas Gotama and Metteyya also being the fourth and fifth Buddhas of the kalpa respectively.

The Koṇāgamana Buddha, is mentioned in a 3rd-century BCE inscription by Ashoka at Nigali Sagar, in today's Nepal. There is an Ashoka pillar at the site today. Ashoka's inscription in the Brahmi script is on the fragment of the pillar still partly buried in the ground. The inscription made when Emperor Asoka at Nigali Sagar in 249 BCE records his visit, the enlargement of a stupa dedicated to the Kanakamuni Buddha, and the erection of a pillar.

According to Xuanzang, Koṇāgamana's relics were held in a stupa in Nigali Sagar, in what is now Kapilvastu District in southern Nepal.

The historical Buddha, Gautama, also called Sakyamuni ("Sage of the Shakyas), is mentioned epigraphically on the Pillar of Ashoka at Rummindei (Lumbini in modern Nepal). The Brahmi script inscription on the pillar gives evidence that Ashoka, emperor of the Maurya Empire, visited the place in 3rd-century BCE and identified it as the birth-place of the Buddha.

The last 28 Buddhas of Theravāda ( aṭavīsi Buddha) 

The Pali literature of the Theravāda tradition includes tales of 28 previous Buddhas. In countries where Theravāda Buddhism is practiced by the majority of people, such as Sri Lanka, Cambodia, Laos, Myanmar, Thailand, it is customary for Buddhists to hold elaborate festivals, especially during the fair weather season, paying homage to the last 28 Buddhas described in the Buddhavamsa. The Buddhavamsa is a text which describes the life of Gautama Buddha and the 27 Buddhas who preceded him, along with the future Metteyya Buddha. The Buddhavamsa is part of the Khuddaka Nikāya, which in turn is part of the Sutta Piṭaka. The Sutta Piṭaka is one of three main sections of the Pāli Canon.

The first three of these Buddhas—Taṇhaṅkara, Medhaṅkara, and Saraṇaṅkara—lived before the time of Dīpankara Buddha. The fourth Buddha, Dīpankara, is especially important, as he was the Buddha who gave niyatha vivarana (prediction of future Buddhahood) to the Brahmin youth who would in the distant future become the bodhisattva Gautama Buddha. After Dīpankara, 25 more noble people (ariya-puggala) would attain enlightenment before Gautama, the historical Buddha.

Many Buddhists also pay homage to the future Buddha, Metteyya. According to Buddhist scripture, Metteya will be a successor of Gautama who will appear on Earth, achieve complete enlightenment, and teach the pure Dharma. The prophecy of the arrival of Metteyya is found in the canonical literature of all Buddhist sects (Theravada, Mahayana, and Vajrayana), and is accepted by most Buddhists as a statement about an event that will take place when the Dharma will have been forgotten on Jambudvipa (the terrestrial realm, where ordinary human beings live).

Mahayana Buddhas 

Mahayana Buddhists venerate numerous Buddhas that are not found in early Buddhism or in Theravada Buddhism. They are generally seen as living in other realms, known as buddha-fields (Sanskrit: buddhakṣetra) or pure lands (Ch: 淨土; p: Jìngtǔ) in East Asian Buddhism. They are sometimes called "celestial Buddhas", since they are not from this earth.

Some of the key Mahayana Buddhas are:

 Akshobhya ("the Imperturbable")
 Amitābha (Amida Buddha, "Infinite Light"), the principal Buddha of Pure Land Buddhism
 Amoghasiddhi (“Infallible Success”)
 Bhaiṣajyaguru ("Medicine guru") also known as "Medicine Buddha", the healing Buddha
 Ratnasambhava ("Jewel Born")
 Vairocana ("the Illuminator"), a key figure in the Avatamsaka Sutra
Prabhūtaratna ("Many Treasures," A Buddha who appears in the Lotus Sutra)
Samantabhadra, a Buddha who is mentioned in the Akṣayamatinirdeśa Sūtra, which states that the bodhisattva Akṣayamati is said to be from the Buddha field of Samantabhadra.
 Lokeśvararāja, a past Buddha who is mentioned in the Larger Sutra of Immeasurable Life
 The 35 Confession Buddhas

In Tantric Buddhism 

In Tantric Buddhism (Vajrayana), one finds some of the same Mahayana Buddhas along with other Buddha figures which are unique to Vajrayana. There are five primary Buddhas known as the "Five Tathagathas": Vairocana, Aksobhya, Ratnasambhava, Amitābha, and Amoghasiddhi. Each is associated with a different consort, direction, aggregate (or, aspect of the personality), emotion, element, color, symbol, and mount.

Buddhist Tantra also includes several female Buddhas, such as Tara, the most popular female Buddha in Tibetan Buddhism, who comes in many forms and colors.

In the tantras, there are various fierce deities which are tantric forms of the Buddhas. These may be fierce (Tibetan: trowo, Sanskrit: krodha) Buddha forms or semi-fierce, and may appear in sexual union with a female Buddha or as a "solitary hero". The Herukas (Tb. khrag 'thung, lit. "blood drinker") are enlightened masculine beings who adopt fierce forms to help beings. They include Yamantaka, Cakrasamvara, Hevajra, Mahākāla, and Vajrakilaya. Dakinis (Tb. khandroma, "sky-goer") are their feminine counterparts, sometimes depicted with a heruka and sometimes as independent deities. The most prevalent wrathful dakinis are Vajrayogini, Vajravārāhī,  Nairatmya, and Kurukullā.

Buddhist mythology overlapped with Hindu mythology. Akshobhya, for example, acquires a fierce Tantric form that is reminiscent of the fierce form of the Hindu god Shiva; in this form he became known by the Buddhist names Heruka, Hevajra, or Samvara. He is known in Japan in this guise as Fudō (“Imperturbable”). The Indian god Bhairava, a fierce bull-headed divinity, was adopted by Tantric Buddhists as Vajrabhairava. Also called Yamantaka (“Slayer of Death”) and identified as the fierce expression of the gentle Manjushri, he was accorded quasi-buddha rank.

There is also the idea of the Adi-Buddha, the "first Buddha" to attain Buddhahood. Variously named as Vajradhara, Samantabhadra and  Vairocana, the first Buddha is also associated with the concept of Dharmakaya. Some historical figures are also seen as Buddhas, such as the Buddhist philosopher Nagarjuna, Tibetan historical figures like Padmasambhava, and Tsongkhapa.

Depictions of the Buddha in art

Buddhas are frequently represented in the form of statues and paintings. Commonly seen designs include:
 The Seated Buddha
 The Reclining Buddha
 The Standing Buddha
Hotei or Budai, the obese Laughing Buddha, usually seen in China and often mistaken as the Buddha in western culture (This figure is believed to be a representation of a medieval Chinese monk who is associated with Maitreya, the future Buddha, and is therefore technically not a Buddha image.)
 the Emaciated Buddha, which shows Siddhartha Gautama during his extreme ascetic practice of starvation.

The Buddha statue shown calling for rain is a pose common in Laos.

Markings
Most depictions of Buddha contain a certain number of markings, which are considered the signs of his enlightenment. These signs vary regionally, but two are common:

a protuberance on the top of the head (denoting superb mental acuity)
long earlobes (denoting superb perception)

In the Pāli Canon, there is frequent mention of a list of thirty-two physical characteristics of the Buddha.

Hand-gestures
The poses and hand-gestures of these statues, known respectively as asanas and mudras, are significant to their overall meaning. The popularity of any particular mudra or asana tends to be region-specific, such as the Vajra (or Chi Ken-in) mudra, which is popular in Japan and Korea but rarely seen in India. Others are more common; for example, the Varada (Wish Granting) mudra is common among standing statues of the Buddha, particularly when coupled with the Abhaya (Fearlessness and Protection) mudra.

See also
List of bodhisattvas
List of named Buddhas
Ten Bodhisattas
Thirty-five Confession Buddhas
Praises to the Twenty-One Taras
Bhadrakalpikasutra
List of Buddha claimants
Glossary of Buddhism
Buddha-nature
Enlightenment in Buddhism
Eternal Buddha
Physical characteristics of the Buddha
Buddha Shenrab
Laughing Buddha

Notes

References

Citations

Sources

External links

BuddhaNet

 
Buddhist philosophical concepts
Buddhist stages of enlightenment